Dis-moi qui tuer (English title: Tell Me Whom to Kill) is a 1965 French drama film directed by Étienne Périer. The screenplay was written by Maurice Fabre and Didier Goulard, based on a novel by Henri Lapierre. The film stars Michèle Morgan and Paul Hubschmid.

Plot
A couple of children come across evidence of a Nazi treasure in an old hotel.

Cast 
 Michèle Morgan as Geneviève Monthannet
 Paul Hubschmid as Reiner Dietrich
 Darío Moreno as Pitou
 Rellys as Le Basta
 Jean Yanne as Federucci
 Jean-Roger Caussimon as Kopf
 Alain Decock as Constantin 
 François Leccia as Marc Pestel
 Germaine Montero as Madame Fayard
 Daniel Allier as Machelin
 Yann Arthus-Bertrand as Galland 
 Fiona Lewis as Pompon

References

External links

1965 films
Films directed by Étienne Périer
1965 drama films
French drama films
1960s French films